The Norwegian warship HNoMS Rap was a torpedo boat built in 1873. She was one of the first torpedo boats to carry the self-propelled Whitehead torpedo after being converted to use them in 1879, the same year the Royal Navy's HMS Lightning entered service. The name Rap (Rapp in the modern spelling) translates as "quick".

Design 
Rap was ordered from Thornycroft shipbuilding company, England, in either 1872 or 1873, and was built at Thornycroft's shipyard at Church Wharf in Chiswick on the River Thames. The Norwegians initially planned to arm her with a spar torpedo, but this may never have been fitted. Rap was briefly used for experiments with a towed torpedo before finally being outfitted with launch racks for the new self-propelled Whitehead torpedoes in 1879. Her initial commanding officer was First Lieutenant Koren, who also designed the torpedo racks.

Although Rap had been built several years earlier, the first true torpedo boat built to carry self-propelled torpedoes was the British HMS Lightning, and she was in fact fitted with such torpedoes before Rap.

With a displacement of less than ten tons, Rap was very limited in terms of endurance and seaworthiness. Over the next three decades Rap would be followed by many other Norwegian torpedo boats of ever-increasing size and complexity. She was finally stricken from the fleet in 1920, long after she had become obsolete.

Galery

Legacy 
Today, Rap is exhibited at the Naval Museum in Horten, Norway.

Rap was also the name given to a class of six motor torpedo boats built for the Royal Norwegian Navy in the 1950s.

Notes

References

 

Museum ships in Norway
Torpedo boats of the Royal Norwegian Navy
Ships built in Chiswick
1873 ships
Ships built by John I. Thornycroft & Company